The 2019 Rice Owls football team represented Rice University in the 2019 NCAA Division I FBS football season. The Owls played their home games at Rice Stadium in Houston, Texas, and competed in the West Division of Conference USA (C–USA). They were led by second-year head coach Mike Bloomgren. They finished the season 3–9, 3–5 in C-USA play to finish in a three-way tie for fourth place in the West Division. Notably, they started the season on a nine-game losing streak before closing out the season by winning their final three games.

Previous season
The Owls finished the 2018 season 2–11, 1–7 in C-USA play to finish in a tie for sixth place in the West Division under first year head coach Mike Bloomgren. They were not invited/did not qualify for any postseason play.  Despite the record, the Owls retained Bloomgren along with a majority of his staff.

Preseason

Award watch lists
Listed in the order that they were released

References:

C-USA media poll
The preseason poll was released prior to the Conference USA media days on July 17–18, 2019. The Owls were predicted to finish in sixth place in the C–USA West Division.

Preseason All–C-USA teams
The Owls were the only team in the West Division that had no players selected to the preseason All−Conference USA teams.

Recruiting class
References:

|}

Personnel

Schedule

Source:

Game summaries

at Army

Wake Forest

vs. Texas

Baylor

Louisiana Tech

at UAB

at UTSA

Southern Miss

Marshall

at Middle Tennessee

North Texas

at UTEP

Source:

References

Rice
Rice Owls football seasons
Rice Owls football